Hubert Jacques "Pit" Martin (December 9, 1943 – November 30, 2008) was a Canadian professional ice hockey centre who served as captain for the Chicago Black Hawks of the National Hockey League (NHL) from 1975 to 1977. He was an NHL All-Star and Bill Masterton Memorial Trophy winner.

Martin played seventeen seasons in the NHL for the Detroit Red Wings, Boston Bruins, Chicago Black Hawks and Vancouver Canucks.

Playing career
Nicknamed Pit after a comic strip character in a French newspaper, Martin was scouted by former NHL goaltender Wilf Cude and joined the Red Wings organization. He is remembered among hockey fans as being involved in one of the most one-sided trades in history.

Martin got his first NHL goal as a member of the Detroit Red Wings in his team's 5-2 loss to the Montreal Canadiens on December 7, 1963.

Martin scored four goals in a single game on January 27, 1966 in Boston's 5-3 victory over Chicago.

In May 1967, Martin, along with Gilles Marotte and Jack Norris, was traded from Boston to Chicago for Phil Esposito, Ken Hodge, and Fred Stanfield, who would become core elements of future Boston powerhouse teams.  However, Martin himself was a bright spot of the trade for the Black Hawks, starring for them for ten seasons as a skilled two-way centre.  He was selected to play in the NHL All-Star Game in four straight seasons.

Martin played 1101 career NHL games from 1961–62 to 1978–79. He recorded 324 goals and 485 assists for 809 points. His best statistical season was the 1972–73 season when he set career highs with 61 assists and 90 points, adding ten goals in the playoffs as the Hawks made it to the Stanley Cup finals. He wore number 7.

Death
On November 30, 2008, Martin was reported missing following a snowmobile accident on Lake Kanasuta near Rouyn-Noranda, Quebec. He was riding a snowmobile behind a friend when the ice on the lake collapsed shortly after his friend had passed over it. Martin was pronounced dead on December 1, 2008. On December 2, 2008, Quebec Provincial Police divers recovered Martin's body from the lake.

Awards
OHA-Jr. First All-Star Team (1962)
OHA-Jr. MVP (1962)
Bill Masterton Trophy (1970)
National Hockey League All-Star Game (1971, 1972, 1973, 1974)

Career statistics

See also
List of NHL players with 1000 games played

References

External links

AP Obituary in the Chicago Sun-Times

1943 births
2008 deaths
Accidental deaths in Quebec
Boston Bruins players
Canadian ice hockey centres
Chicago Blackhawks captains
Chicago Blackhawks players
Deaths by drowning in Canada
Detroit Red Wings players
Hamilton Red Wings (OHA) players
Hamilton Tiger Cubs players
Sportspeople from Rouyn-Noranda
Pittsburgh Hornets players
Vancouver Canucks players
Ice hockey people from Quebec
Bill Masterton Memorial Trophy winners